Ingrid Jensen (born January 12, 1966) is a Canadian jazz trumpeter.

Music career
Jensen was born in North Vancouver and grew up in Nanaimo. She received a scholarship to the Berklee College of Music in Boston.

After graduating from Berklee, she toured with the Vienna Art Orchestra and taught at the Bruckner Conservatory in Austria when she was 25. She went back to the U.S. in 1994 and became a member of the DIVA Big Band. During the same year, her debut album Vernal Fields (Enja, 1994) appeared and won a Juno Award.

Jensen has worked with Maria Schneider, Steve Wilson, Jeff "Tain" Watts, Dr. Lonnie Smith, Bob Berg, Gary Bartz, Bill Stewart, Terri Lyne Carrington, Geoffrey Keezer, Billy Hart, George Garzone, Chris Connor, Victor Lewis, Clark Terry, Frank Wess, and Billy Taylor, as well as her sister Christine Jensen.

She has performed on Saturday Night Live with the British soul singer Corrine Bailey Rae and in the horn section backing actor Denis Leary.

Discography

As leader
 Vernal Fields (Enja, 1995)
 Around the World I (ACT, 1997)
 Leave It to DIVA (DIVA 1997)
 Here on Earth (Enja, 1997)
 Higher Ground (Enja, 1999)
 Now as Then with Gary Versace, Jon Wikan (Justin Time, 2003)
 At Sea (ArtistShare, 2005)
 Flurry (ArtistShare, 2007)
 Kind of New with Jason Miles (Whaling City Sound, 2015)
 Infinitude with Christine Jensen, Ben Monder (Whirlwind, 2016)
 Invisible Sounds with Steve Treseler (Whirlwind, 2018)

As guest
With Maria Schneider
 Allegresse (ArtistShare, 2000)
 Days Of Wine And Roses - Live at the Jazz Standard (ArtistShare, 2000)
 Concert in the Garden (ArtistShare, 2004)
 Sky Blue (ArtistShare, 2007)

With others
 Darcy James Argue, Infernal Machines (New Amsterdam, 2009)
 Darcy James Argue, Brooklyn Babylon (New Amsterdam, 2013)
 ARTEMIS, ARTEMIS (Blue Note, 2020)
 Otto Brandenburg, Otto Brandenburg (Mermaid Music, 1989)
 Canadian Brass, Canadiana; one track - "Both Sides Now" (Linus Entertainment, 2021)
 Terri Lyne Carrington, The Mosaic Project (Concord Jazz, 2011)
 Terri Lyne Carrington, The Mosaic Project: Love and Soul (Concord, 2015)
 George Colligan, The Newcomer (SteepleChase, 1997)
 Chris Connor, Haunted Heart (HighNote, 2001)
 Dena DeRose, Another World (Sharp Nine, 1999)
 Peter Herbert, B-A-C-H A Chromatic Universe (Between the Lines, 2000)
 Monika Herzig, Sheroes (Whaling City Sound, 2018)
 Anne Mette Iversen, On the Other Side 2003
 Christine Jensen, Collage (Effendi, 2000)
 Christine Jensen, Treelines (Justin Time, 2010)
 Mimi Jones, Balance (Hot Tone Music, 2013)
 Geoffrey Keezer, Falling Up (2003)
 Virginia Mayhew, A Simple Thank You (Renma, 2007)
 Sarah McKenzie, We Could Be Lovers (2014)
 Sarah McLachlan, Shine On (Universal, 2014)
 Chris McNulty, Whispers of the Heart (2006)
 Tobias Meinhart, Natural Perception (Enja, 2015)
 Tobias Meinhart, Silent Dreamer (Enja, 2015)
 Eric Person, Rhythm Edge (2007)
 Karl Ratzer, Bayou (Bellaphon, 1993)
 Dianne Reeves, Beautiful Life (Concord, 2013)
 Rufus Reid, Quiet Pride (Motema, 2013)
 George Schuller, Round 'Bout Now (Playscape, 2003)
 Judi Silvano, Let Yourself Go (Zoho, 2004)
 Ike Sturm, Jazz Mass (2009)
 Helen Sung, Sung Without Words (Stricker Street 2018)
 Roseanna Vitro, Catchin' Some Rays (Telarc, 1997)
 Dan Wall, Off the Wall (Enja, 1997)

References

External links
 Official Site
 Podcast featuring "At Sea" by Ingrid Jensen

1966 births
Living people
People from North Vancouver
Musicians from British Columbia
Women jazz musicians
Berklee College of Music alumni
Canadian jazz trumpeters
Enja Records artists
Peabody Institute faculty
Juno Award for Traditional Jazz Album of the Year winners
21st-century trumpeters
21st-century women musicians
Women music educators
Justin Time Records artists
Women trumpeters
ArtistShare artists
SteepleChase Records artists
Whirlwind Recordings artists